Liberty Township is a township in Jackson County, Kansas, USA.  As of the 2000 census, its population was 513.

History
Liberty Township was formed in 1872.

Geography
Liberty Township covers an area of 35.43 square miles (91.76 square kilometers); of this, 0.06 square miles (0.14 square kilometers) or 0.15 percent is water. The stream of Spring Creek runs through this township.

Adjacent townships
 Netawaka Township (north)
 Whiting Township (northeast)
 Straight Creek Township (east)
 Garfield Township (southeast)
 Franklin Township (south)
 Banner Township (southwest)
 Jefferson Township (west)
 Wetmore Township, Nemaha County (northwest)

Major highways
 U.S. Route 75

References
 U.S. Board on Geographic Names (GNIS)
 United States Census Bureau cartographic boundary files

External links
 US-Counties.com
 City-Data.com

Townships in Jackson County, Kansas
Townships in Kansas